Genistidium is a monotypic genus of flowering plants in the legume family, Fabaceae. It belongs to the subfamily Faboideae. It contains the single species Genistidium dumosum, the brushpea. It is native to Texas and adjacent Mexico.

References

Robinieae
Monotypic Fabaceae genera
Flora of Texas
Flora of Mexico